Lewis Burroughs (1714 - 1786) was an eighteenth century  Irish Anglican priest.

Burroughs was born in County Londonderry and educated at Trinity College, Dublin. He was the Archdeacon of Derry from 1785 until his death.

His son was the judge and politician Sir William Burroughs, 1st Baronet

References

1786 deaths
1714 births
Archdeacons of Derry
Alumni of Trinity College Dublin
People from County Londonderry